José Leonardo Cáceres Ovelar (born 28 April 1985) is a Paraguayan international footballer as a centre back.

Career
Cáceres has played club football for Independiente Campo Grande, Resistencia SC, Pettirossi, Sp. Trinidense, Nacional, Colo-Colo and Cerro Porteño.

International career
He was called to be international with Paraguay in 2013.

References

External links
 

1985 births
Living people
Paraguayan footballers
Paraguayan expatriate footballers
Paraguay international footballers
Independiente F.B.C. footballers
Sportivo Trinidense footballers
Silvio Pettirossi footballers
Resistencia S.C. footballers
Club Nacional footballers
Colo-Colo footballers
Deportes Tolima footballers
Paraguayan Primera División players
Chilean Primera División players
Expatriate footballers in Chile
Expatriate footballers in Colombia
Association football defenders